(Parliamentary) Committee on Transport and Communications (TU) is a parliamentary committee in the Swedish Riksdag. The committee areas of responsibility concern roads, railway, the sea and air transport, road traffic safety, mail services, telecommunication, and Information technology (IT) as well as research activities in the field of communication.

The committee's Speaker is Ulrika Heie from the Centre Party, with Thomas Morell as the vice-Speaker from the Sweden Democrats.

List of speakers for the committee

List of vice-speakers for the committee

References

External links 
Riksdag - Trafikutskottet Riksdag - Transport and Communications Committee

Committees of the Riksdag